He Rides Tall is a 1964 American Western film directed by R. G. Springsteen and written by Charles Irwin and Robert Creighton Williams. The film stars Tony Young, Dan Duryea, Jo Morrow, Madlyn Rhue, R. G. Armstrong, and Joel Fluellen. The film was released on February 26, 1964, by Universal Pictures.

Plot

Cast 
Tony Young as Marshal Morg Rocklin
Dan Duryea as Bart Thorne
Jo Morrow as Katie McCloud
Madlyn Rhue as Ellie Daniels
R. G. Armstrong as Joshua "Josh" McCloud
Joel Fluellen as Dr. Sam
Carl Reindel as Gil McCloud
Mickey Simpson as Onie
George Murdock as Burt
Michael Carr as Lefty
George O. Petrie as Crowley

References

External links 
 

1964 films
1960s English-language films
American Western (genre) films
1964 Western (genre) films
Universal Pictures films
Films directed by R. G. Springsteen
1960s American films